Star Odyssey (Italian: Sette uomini d'oro nello spazio / Seven Gold Men in Space) is a 1979 Italian film directed by Alfonso Brescia. The film is also known as Space Odyssey, Metallica and Captive Planet in other video markets.

Plot summary 
In the year 2312, a group of aliens auction off insignificant planets and the winner of the auction for Sol 3 (Earth) is evil despot named Kress. He soon flies to "Sol 3" in what is the first contact with beings from another planet for those living there. Kress starts gathering humanoid slaves using his robot army to sell them to his evil counterparts.

Defending "Sol 3" against the new owner is the kindly Professor Maury and his ragtag band of human, one of which wears a Spider-Man t-shirt, and robot friends. Maury and his defenders set out to reclaim the planet from Kress and his cyborg army. Their plan is to destroy the metal of the alien ship, called Iridium (or etherium) after discovering its weakness.

After being defeated and retreating from the planet, Kress resells the planet at the space auction for a profit.

Production
Star Odyssey is one of the four low-budget Italian space opera movies produced in the wake of Star Wars by Italian director Alfonso Brescia (under the pseudonym Al Bradley). This is the fourth and final film in Alfonso Brescia's sci-fi series, with the others being Cosmos: War of the Planets (a.k.a. Year Zero War in Space), Battle of the Stars (a.k.a. Battle in Interstellar Space), and War of the Robots (a.k.a. Reactor).

The film re-uses many of the effects and costumes from War of the Robots. "Popular Mechanics" noted the "light-sabers" were cardboard swords painted with fluorescent paint. "Worst Movies Ever Made" found the effects to be laughable and the story confused at best.

Cast  
Yanti Somer as Irene
Gianni Garko as Dirk Laramie
Malisa Longo as Bridget
Chris Avram as Shawn
Ennio Balbo
Roberto Dell'Acqua as Norman
Aldo Amoroso Pioso
Nino Castelnuovo
Gianfranca Dionisi
Pino Ferrara
Aldo Funari
Cesare Gelli
Claudio Undari
Filippo Perrone
Franco Ressel as Commander Barr
Massimo Righi
Silvano Tranquilli
Claudio Zucchet

Reception
"Creature Feature" found the movie to be an example of sci-fi so bad it has to be seen to be believed, giving the movie 2 out of 5 stars. "Popular Mechanics" noted the movie was a dreadful trashpile. Techradar found the movie either insufferable or hilariously bad, depending on your mood.

References

External links 

1979 films
Films directed by Alfonso Brescia
Space opera films
1970s Italian-language films
Films set in the 24th century
Robot films
Italian science fiction films
Films scored by Marcello Giombini
1970s science fiction films
1970s Italian films